Danny!, also known as D. Swain, is an American rapper, producer and composer. In a five-year period, he has self-released twelve albums, which include five full-length albums, an EP, three instrumental albums and even a greatest hits compilation.

Though signed to Definitive Jux in early 2007, the self-proclaimed "prolific producer/MC" never released an album with the label. Instead, selected tracks from Danny!'s discography—all previously released on his vanity Badenov Records/1911 Music imprint—have been made available as a free download on Def Jux's revamped website, which boasts an extensive digital download section. A single titled "Just Friends" came out in March 2009 and is Danny!'s first, and to date only, official Def Jux release.

The artist would later sign to Interscope Records to little fanfare, in the wake of Where Is Danny?s success in 2010. He left Interscope the following year and signed to the re-launched Okayplayer Records in 2012, releasing Payback on September 25. In 2016 he announced a new album, The Book of Daniel, but it has not been released.

Studio albums
{|class="wikitable"
! rowspan="2" width="33"|Year
! rowspan="2" width="150"|Title
! colspan="10"|Peak chart positions
! width="150" rowspan="2"|Notes
|-
!style="width:3em;font-size:75%"|US
!style="width:3em;font-size:75%"|US R&B
!style="width:3em;font-size:75%"|US Heat.
!style="width:3em;font-size:75%"|US Ind.
!style="width:3em;font-size:75%"|US Int.
!style="width:3em;font-size:75%"|UK
!style="width:3em;font-size:75%"|GER
!style="width:3em;font-size:75%"|FRA
!style="width:3em;font-size:75%"|CAN
!style="width:3em;font-size:75%"|JAP
|-
|align="center"| 2004
|The College Kicked-Out
Label: 1911 Music/Badenov Records (BR # 99427)
Released: November 2, 2004
|align="center"|—
|align="center"|—
|align="center"|—
|align="center"|—
|align="center"|112
|align="center"|143
|align="center"|177
|align="center"|189
|align="center"|—
|align="center"|—
|
Debut studio album.
|-
|align="center"| 2005
|F.O.O.D.
Label: 1911 Music/Badenov Records (BR # 62250)
Released: May 17, 2005
|align="center"|—
|align="center"|—
|align="center"|—
|align="center"|—
|align="center"|103
|align="center"|129
|align="center"|171
|align="center"|152
|align="center"|—
|align="center"|91
|-
|align="center"| 2006
|Charm
Label: 1911 Music/Badenov Records (BR # 37468)
Released: March 14, 2006
|align="center"|—
|align="center"|—
|align="center"|47
|align="center"|46
|align="center"|78
|align="center"|111
|align="center"|—
|align="center"|106
|align="center"|191
|align="center"|74
|
Re-released on Definitive Jux as a four-song mini-EP available as a free download.
|-
|align="center"| 2008
|And I Love H.E.R.: Original Motion Picture Soundtrack
Label: 1911 Music/Badenov Records (BR # 38922)
Released: June 24, 2008
|align="center"|164
|align="center"|—
|align="center"|29
|align="center"|38
|align="center"|13
|align="center"|62
|align="center"|66
|align="center"|98
|align="center"|102
|align="center"|33
|
|-
|align="center"| 2009
|Where Is Danny?
Label: 1911 Music/Badenov Records (BR # 38922)
Released: October 13, 2009
|align="center"|—
|align="center"|—
|align="center"|—
|align="center"|—
|align="center"|—
|align="center"|—
|align="center"|—
|align="center"|—
|align="center"|—
|align="center"|—
|
|-
|align="center"| 2012
|Payback
Label: Okayplayer
Released: September 25, 2012
|align="center"|—
|align="center"|—
|align="center"|—
|align="center"|—
|align="center"|—
|align="center"|—
|align="center"|—
|align="center"|—
|align="center"|—
|align="center"|—
|
|-
|align="center" colspan="13" style="font-size: 8pt"| "—" denotes releases that did not chart.
|-
|}

Instrumental albums
{|class="wikitable"
! rowspan="2" width="33"|Year
! rowspan="2" width="225"|Title
! colspan="10"|Peak chart positions
! width="150" rowspan="2"|Notes
|-
!style="width:3em;font-size:75%"|US
!style="width:3em;font-size:75%"|US R&B
!style="width:3em;font-size:75%"|US Heat.
!style="width:3em;font-size:75%"|US Ind.
!style="width:3em;font-size:75%"|US Int.
!style="width:3em;font-size:75%"|UK
!style="width:3em;font-size:75%"|GER
!style="width:3em;font-size:75%"|FRA
!style="width:3em;font-size:75%"|CAN
!style="width:3em;font-size:75%"|JAP
|-
|align="center"| 2006
|Dream, Interrupted
Label: 1911 Music/Badenov Records (BR # 90629)
Released: August 14, 2006
|align="center"|—
|align="center"|—
|align="center"|—
|align="center"|166
|align="center"|121
|align="center"|88
|align="center"|—
|align="center"|—
|align="center"|—
|align="center"|93
|
First in a three-part instrumental album series.
|-
|align="center"| 2007
|Dream, Fulfilled
Label: 1911 Music/Badenov Records (BR # 90669)
Released: April 23, 2007
|align="center"|—
|align="center"|—
|align="center"|—
|align="center"|192
|align="center"|144
|align="center"|61
|align="center"|—
|align="center"|—
|align="center"|—
|align="center"|—
|
Re-released in the US after a UK-only initial release.
|-
|align="center"| 2008
|Dream, Extinguished
Label: 1911 Music/Badenov Records (BR # 94292)
Released: January 29, 2008
|align="center"|—
|align="center"|—
|align="center"|—
|align="center"|—
|align="center"|—
|align="center"|—
|align="center"|—
|align="center"|—
|align="center"|—
|align="center"|—
|
Shelved in 2008 for reasons unknown; import version officially released in 2009.
|-
|align="center" colspan="13" style="font-size: 8pt"| "—" denotes releases that did not chart.
|-
|}

Compilation albums
{|class="wikitable"
! rowspan="2" width="33"|Year
! rowspan="2" width="150"|Title
! colspan="10"|Peak chart positions
! width="150" rowspan="2"|Notes
|-
!style="width:3em;font-size:75%"|US
!style="width:3em;font-size:75%"|US R&B
!style="width:3em;font-size:75%"|US Heat.
!style="width:3em;font-size:75%"|US Ind.
!style="width:3em;font-size:75%"|US Int.
!style="width:3em;font-size:75%"|UK
!style="width:3em;font-size:75%"|GER
!style="width:3em;font-size:75%"|FRA
!style="width:3em;font-size:75%"|CAN
!style="width:3em;font-size:75%"|JAP
|-
|align="center" rowspan="3"| 2007
|21st Century Masters: The Millennium Collection: The Best of Danny!
Label: 1911 Music/Badenov Records (BR # 81883)
Released: August 7, 2007
|align="center"|—
|align="center"|103
|align="center"|43
|align="center"|78
|align="center"|46
|align="center"|87
|align="center"|—
|align="center"|143
|align="center"|—
|align="center"|90
|-
|Behind the Beats, Vol. 1
Label: 1911 Music/Badenov Records (BR # 51991)
Released: September 11, 2007
|align="center"|—
|align="center"|—
|align="center"|—
|align="center"|—
|align="center"|—
|align="center"|—
|align="center"|—
|align="center"|—
|align="center"|—
|align="center"|111
|
Japan-only promotional release.
|-
|Behind the Beats, Vol. 2
Label: 1911 Music/Badenov Records (BR # 51992)
Released: October 23, 2007
|align="center"|—
|align="center"|—
|align="center"|—
|align="center"|—
|align="center"|—
|align="center"|—
|align="center"|—
|align="center"|—
|align="center"|—
|align="center"|114
|
Japan-only promotional release.
|-
|align="center" colspan="13" style="font-size: 8pt"| "—" denotes releases that did not chart.
|-
|}

Extended plays
{|class="wikitable"
! rowspan="2" width="33"|Year
! rowspan="2" width="150"|Title
! colspan="10"|Peak chart positions
! width="150" rowspan="2"|Notes
|-
!style="width:3em;font-size:75%"|US
!style="width:3em;font-size:75%"|US R&B
!style="width:3em;font-size:75%"|US Heat.
!style="width:3em;font-size:75%"|US Ind.
!style="width:3em;font-size:75%"|US Int.
!style="width:3em;font-size:75%"|UK
!style="width:3em;font-size:75%"|GER
!style="width:3em;font-size:75%"|FRA
!style="width:3em;font-size:75%"|CAN
!style="width:3em;font-size:75%"|JAP
|-
|align="center"| 2007
|Danny Is Dead
Label: 1911 Music/Badenov Records (BR # 51019)
Released: July 17, 2007
|align="center"|165
|align="center"|111
|align="center"|31
|align="center"|76
|align="center"|23
|align="center"|80
|align="center"|60
|align="center"|71
|align="center"|75
|align="center"|35
|
Re-released on Definitive Jux as a three-song mini-EP available for free download.
|-
|}

Music videos
{|class="wikitable"
! width="33"|Year
! width="215"| Title
! width="180"| Director(s)
|-
|align="center"|2007
|"Fly, Pt. 2"
|Daniel Swain, Tim Arnold
|-
! width="33"|Year
! width="215"| Title
! width="180"| Director(s)
|-
|align="center"|2012
|"I Don't Wanna Hear That Shit"
|Tim Arnold, Skip Terpstra
|-
! width="33"|Year
! width="215"| Title
! width="180"| Director(s)
|-
|align="center"|2012
|"Goodbye Love"
|Jorge Sanchez
|-
|}

Singles
"I'm Movin' Out", 2004
"My Baby", 2004
"Second Time Around", 2004
"I Only Wanna Be With You", 2005
"My Whole World", 2005
"V.I.P.", 2005
"Fullaschidt", 2005
"Charm", 2006
"Strange Fruit", 2006
"Can't Wait", 2006
"Cafe Surreal", 2006
"Fullaschidt (remix)", 2007
"Check It Out", 2007
"Fly, Pt. 2", 2007
"The World Is Yours", 2007
"Guess Who's Back", 2008
"I Don't Know", 2008
"The Groove", 2008
"Just Friends", 2009 U.S. #88
"I Don't Wanna Hear That Shit", 2011
"Goodbye Love", 2012
"Evil (feat. Gavin Castleton and Amber Tamblyn)", 2012

Guest appearances
 The Bins - "Dear Jane," from Every Minute of the Day (2011)

References

External links
 [ Danny!'s discography] on Allmusic
 Danny!'s discography on Discogs

Hip hop discographies
Discographies of American artists